This is a list of Mikoyan MiG-29 operators.

Europe

Belarus had 50 aircraft in service

Belarus Air Force

Bulgaria had 11 MiG-29s in inventory as of 2021. Bulgaria bought 15 MiG-29, before including 2 MiG-29UB. Also 4 MiG-29 in reserve. One aircraft disjointed in Bulgarian military factory. One MiG-29A crashed in 1994 and one MiG-29UB in 2004. They are scheduled to be replaced by F-16s by 2024.

Bulgarian Air Force
2/3 Iztrebitelna Avio Eskadrila based at Graf Ignatievo operates MiG-29A and MiG-29UB (9.51).

Poland had 23 MiG-29s in service as of 2021. Poland bought 12 aircraft (nine MiG-29 9.12A and three MiG-29UB 9.51) from the Soviet Union between 1989 and 1990. Next ten ex-Czech aircraft (nine MiG-29A and one MiG-29UB) were exchanged with Czech Republic for 11 Polish PZL W-3 Sokół helicopters in 1996. Last 22 were handed over by Germany in 2003. In December 2017 a MiG-29A #67 from 23rd Air Base in Mińsk Mazowiecki crashed on approach. The pilot survived. In July 2018 a MiG-29A #4103 from 22nd Air Base in Malbork crashed near Elbląg during night flight. The pilot died after ejecting. In total Poland had 44 aircraft (36 MiG-29A and eight MiG-29UB) but only 30 aircraft were operational in two units.

Between 2001 and 2005 all aircraft were upgraded with domestic SC-10D2 Supraśl IFF, Rockwell Collins AN/ARN-153 (TCN 500) TACAN and ANV-241 MMR VOR/ILS receivers, Trimble 2101AP civilian GPS receiver, Thomson-CSF SB-14 radar warning receiver, RS 6113-2 VHF/UHF radio with R-862 control panel and new anti-collision lights. Their service life was extended up to 4000 flight hour or until 2028. In 2011-2014 period 16 aircraft from the 23rd Air Base (former 1. elt) received second modernization package, consisting of MFCD 5"x7" multi-function display, MDP mission computer, Up-Front Control Panel (UFCP), Honeywell Enhanced GPS Inertial navigation system (EGI) with SAASM, MIL-STD-1553B data bus and Rockwell Collins AN/ARC-210 (Talon RT-8200) VHF/UHF radio, exploitation was changed from flight hours to be based on technical status. All the units are to be replaced by F-35 Lightning II.

In March 2022, Poland sought to transfer all of its Mig-29 aircraft to Ukraine, following the Russian invasion of Ukraine. However, the transfer was opposed by Poland's partners in other NATO countries, including the United States.

Polish Air Force
23rd Air Base in Mińsk Mazowiecki operates MiG-29 (9.12A) and MiG-29UB (9.51) from 2011.
1. Pułk Lotnictwa Myśliwskiego based at Mińsk Mazowiecki operated MiG-29 (9.12A) and MiG-29UB (9.51) between 1989 and 2000. Unit was reorganized to 1. ELT.
1. eskadra lotnictwa taktycznego based at Mińsk Mazowiecki operated MiG-29 (9.12A) and MiG-29UB (9.51) between 2001 and 2010. Unit was reorganized to 23rd Air Base.
22nd Air Base in Malbork operates MiG-29 (9.12A) and MiG-29UB (9.51) from 2011.
41. eskadra lotnictwa taktycznego based at Malbork operated MiG-29 (9.12A) and MiG-29UB (9.51) between 2005 and 2010. Unit was reorganized to 22rd Air Base.

Russia has 260 MiG-29s in inventory as of 2021
Russian Aerospace Forces
Russian Air Force
14th Fighter Aviation Regiment - Kursk
200th Training Air Base - Armavir
19th Fighter Aviation Regiment - Millerovo
102nd Military Base - Gyumri

 

Russian Naval Aviation
100th Shipborne Fighter Aviation Regiment

Serbia inherited four MiG-29B and one MiG-29UB from Yugoslavia. Refurbished and returned to service in 2009. One MiG-29 crashed in 2009. By 2011, only 3 MiG-29s (2 single seaters and 1 dual seater) were operational. In 2017, the Serbian government signed an agreement with their Russian counterparts for 4 MiG-29 and 2 MiG-29UB that were modernized. Belarus also donated 4 aircraft with a more modest modernization package. While the aircraft were donated, modernization was paid for by Serbia. Deliveries of all 10 aircraft were completed in 2021, bringing the total number to 14.

Serbian Air Force
101st squadron based at 204th Air Base (Batajnica Airbase) operates MiG-29 (9.12B) and MiG-29UB (9.51).

Ukraine inherited hundreds of MiG-29s at the dissolution of the USSR. 37-70 MiG-29s still in use as of March 2019

Ukrainian Air Force
204th Fighter Aviation Brigade
9th Fighter Aviation Brigade
114th Fighter Aviation Brigade
40th Fighter Aviation Brigade

Asia

Bangladesh has 8 aircraft in service. 16 MiG-29s were ordered, however procurement was cancelled after 8 aircraft were delivered.

Bangladesh Air Force
8th Squadron based at Kurmitola operates 6 MiG-29BM (9.12BM) and 2 MiG-29UB (9.51).

The Indian Air Force operates total 67 aircraft as of May 2021. In July 2020 the Indian Air Force got two more Mig-29UPG which were upgraded from the last two remaining legacy MiG 29s, taking the number of aircraft from 65 to 67. In January 2021, the Indian Ministry of Defense finally approved the upgrading of existing aircraft to UPG2 Standard with AESA Radar, more advanced electronic warfare suites and weapons. The purchase of 21 additional aircraft from Russia, to be constructed from the airframes mothballed in the late-1980s and upgraded with "the latest avionics and electronic warfare suites." and the request for a proposal to buy two more MiG-29s airframes from Malaysia In February 2021. IAF want to take the total existing Mig-29UPG numbers from 67 to 90, with 5 operational squadrons until 2022 March–April. The final purchase order of 21 more aircraft was placed on February, 2021.  .

In September 2008, it was reported that India intended to buy 30 more Mig-29K.

Indian Air Force
28 Squadron (First Supersonics) – based at AFS Jamnagar
47 Squadron (Black Archers) – based at AFS Adampur
223 Squadron (Tridents) – based at AFS Adampur
Indian Naval Air Arm
INAS 300 (The White Tigers) – based at INS Hansa
INAS 303 (The Black Panthers) – based at INS Hansa

Kazakhstan has 12 MiG-29 and 2 MiG-29UB fighters in service.

Myanmar has 31 MiG-29s in service with 26 of them are MiG-29SM/SEs (9.13M and 9.13) and 5 MiG-29UBs (9.51 trainer version).

North Korea has 15 out of 40 MiG-29 aircraft in service.
Korean People's Air Force
57th Air Regiment based at Sunchon

Turkmenistan has 20 aircraft in service.

Uzbekistan has 30 aircraft in service.

Africa

Algeria has 32 aircraft in service. Algeria has ordered 65 MiG-29s, four MiG-29UBT in total. 36 MiG-29SMT were to be delivered between 2007 and 2008. However, in March 2008, in an unprecedented move, Algeria decided to return 15 of the MiG-29SMT aircraft delivered in 2006-07 back to Russia, citing the "inferior quality" of certain components and units. Following this the MiG-29SMT has been cancelled with Su-30's instead ordered. 14 Mig-29M/M2s on order.
113e Escadron de Chasse based at Tindouf operates MiG-29S (9.13S) upgraded to MiG-29SMT standard.
143e Escadron de Chasse based at Ouargla operates MiG-29S (9.13S) and MiG-29UB (9.51) upgraded to MiG-29SMT standard.
153e Escadron de Chasse based at Béchar-Oukda/Leger operates MiG-29S (9.13S) upgraded to MiG-29SMT standard.
193e Escadron de Chasse based at Bou Sfer operates MiG-29S (9.13S) and MiG-29UB (9.51) upgraded to MiG-29SMT standard.

Sudanese Air Force has 22-23 aircraft in service. According to Sudanese Defense Minister Abdul Rahim Mohammed Hussein, Sudan bought 12 MiG-29 from Russia in 2004 (despite the UN arms embargo and other 12 in 2008 (probable Russian surplus via Belarus). One MiG-29 was shot down in May 2008 by heavy machine gun fire during a CAS mission;

Eritrea received 8 aircraft in 1998, of these 6 are known to be operational.

Middle East

Azerbaijan Air Force has 11 MiG-29S and 3 MiG-29UB aircraft in service.

Iran bought MiG-29s from the Soviet Union, around 40, all of them 9.12A versions, directly from Soviet air force and also impounded four Iraqi MiG-29s that had fled to Iran during the 1991 Gulf War.
Around 36 aircraft currently in service with IRIAF (30 MiG-29A 9.12A and 6 Mig-29UB 9.51)

Islamic Republic of Iran Air Force
11 TFS based at Tehran Mehrabad International Airport operates MiG-29 (9.12A) and MiG-29UB (9.51).
23 TFS based at Shaheed Fakhouri Air Base in Tabriz operates MiG-29 (9.12A) and MiG-29UB (9.51).

Syria has an unknown number of aircraft in service. Sources state between 22 and 84. MiG-29SM for the Syrian Air Force based on the MiG-29SM, except the Syrian MiG-29SM uses the 9.12 airframe. RAC MiG developed a special variant for Syria. Russia repaired and upgraded several Syrian Air Force MiG-29 fighter jets. In 2007 Syria reportedly signed a deal for 24 Mig-29M2s that was delayed, in 2011 Syria signed a deal for another 24 Mig-29M2's.

In 2019, Belarus reportedly upgraded Syria's fleet of MiG-29s with the BCO "Talisman" Electronic Warfare System, giving the fighter jet a significant increase to its capability.

Syrian Air Force
697 Squadron based at Tsaykal
698 Squadron based at Tsaykal
699 Squadron based at Tsaykal

Yemen has 14 aircraft in service.  Since 2005 the standard was MiG-29SMT, replacing SE version (14 SE and UB delivered in 2001, after sent to MiG to be updated). Together with those 14 aircraft updated, RSK-MiG sold 6 new examples. Later there was eventually another batch delivered.  Operational status is unknown due to civil war and foreign intervention.

Yemen Air Force

Latin America

Cuban Air Force has 14 aircraft with six of them in flying condition.

Peru acquired 18 aircraft from Belarus in 1996, 16 MiG-29 (9.13) and 2 MiG-29UB (9.51) (one purchased new by Belarus to Russia to replace the unit rejected by the Peruvian Air Force for technical issues). Two aircraft were lost in accidents in 1997 and 2001 respectively. Three additional MiG-29SE (9.13SE) were purchased from Russia in 1998 to replace the lost aircraft.

On 12 August 2008 a contract of US$106 million was signed with RAC MiG for a custom-made SM-based upgrade of eight MiG-29 called MiG-29SMP. Four MiG-29SMP (3 single-seaters and 1 twin-seater) were displayed in maneuvers during the Peruvian Air Force anniversary celebrations on 23 July 2012.

Peruvian Air Force
Escuadrón Aéreo Nº 612 based at Chiclayo operates MiG-29/MiG-29SE/MiG-29SMP (9.13/9.13SE) and MiG-29UBP (9.51).

North America

The United States bought 21 aircraft from Moldova.
Different private owned companies and individuals bought MiG-29s from former USSR republics.

Former operators

Czechoslovakia had 18 MiG-29A and 2 MiG-29UB from 1989. All were passed on (in 1:1 ratio) to Czech Republic and Slovakia.
Czechoslovakian Air Force

Czech Republic received nine MiG-29A and one MiG-29UB. Aircraft are no longer in service, being exchanged with Poland for 11 PZL W-3 Sokół helicopters in 1996.
Czech Air Force

East Germany received 24 aircraft delivered in 1988–1989, including 4 MiG-29UBs. They were based at Preschen. Upon the German Reunification in 1990 all were passed to the West German Air Force.
Air Forces of the National People's Army

Germany inherited 24 aircraft from East Germany in 1990 and upgraded them to NATO compatibility. One was lost, and one was kept for display when the remaining 22 were transferred to Poland in 2003, following the arrival of the Eurofighter Typhoon which replaced them.
German Air Force
JG73 "Steinhoff" based at Laage operated MiG-29 (9.12A) and MiG-29UB (9.51) under local designation MiG-29G.

Hungary received 28 MIG-29s in 1993 as debt compensation from Russia. The last of them was retired in December, 2010. Eight of them were put up for sale with the bidding starting at US$18 Million. The bidders had to submit offers by 15 September 2011
Hungarian Air Force
2. Vadászrepülö Század was based at Kecskemét Air Base was operating MiG-29 (9.12A) and MiG-29UB (9.51).
59th Wing, Dongó Squadron was based at Kecskemét Air Base was operating MiG-29 (9.12A) and MiG-29UB (9.51).

Iraq received 37 aircraft. 16 were destroyed in Gulf War, 4 evacuated to Iran. Remaining squadron (with 17 aircraft) withdrawn from service in 1995 due to engine TBO expiry.
Iraqi Air Force

Israeli Air Force
2 aircraft, borrowed from an undisclosed European air force (according to online images aircraft from the Polish Air Force were used) for evaluation. Flown by 601 Squadron, the Israeli Air Force's flight test center.

Malaysia received a total of 18 MiG-29s. 16 left with 2 lost to crashes in recent years and the Royal Malaysian Air Force have retired its MiG-29s squadron from active service in 2018. All 16 MiG-29s are kept as Active Reserve.

Royal Malaysian Air Force
19 Sqn Cobra based at RMAF Kuantan formerly operates single seater MiG-29S (9.13S) and two seater trainers MiG-29UB (9.51) under local designation (MiG-29N).

Moldova had 34 aircraft inherited from USSR. 6 of them were sold to Yemen, 21 bought by USA, 1 MiG-29S sold to Romania. Last 6 remaining MiG-29S were overhauled in Ukraine recently. Yemen returned 6 MiG-29S.The remaining Moldovan MiGs are grounded due to lack of spare parts.
Moldovan Air Force

Romania received 20 MiG-29A delivered from USSR starting in 1989 plus 1 MiG-29S from Moldova. Romanian aircraft were retired in 2003 after funding was cut for upgrade programme.
Romanian Air Force

Upon its dissolution in 1991 the Soviet Union had approximately 1,000 aircraft in service. Upon the break-up they were passed to Belarus (50), Ukraine (220), Kazakhstan (40), Uzbekistan (30), Turkmenistan (20). The remaining 600+ were passed to Russia. Many were subsequently sold off to third-party states and/or written off.
Soviet Air Force

Yugoslavia received 14 MiG-29Bs and 2 MiG-29UBs from the Soviet Union in 1987 and 1988. During operation Allied Force, six MiG-29s were shot down, while another three and one MiG-29UB were destroyed on the ground by NATO, One MiG-29 was also lost in a noncombat related accident. Since the dissolution of Yugoslavia the remaining four MiG-29s and single MiG-29UB were passed on to Serbia.
Yugoslav Air Force
127th squadron operated 14 MiG-29Bs and 2 MiG-29UB.

The Slovak air force retired their MiG-29s in 2022.
Slovak Air Force

See also

Mikoyan MiG-29M
Mikoyan MiG-33
Mikoyan MiG-35

References

Russian Aircraft Corporation MiG
Mikoyan MiG-29
MiG-29
Mik